"Sing That Song" is a song performed by English producer and songwriter Tieks, featuring vocals from Celeste. The song was released as a digital download in the United Kingdom on 9 September 2014 through Atlantic Records. The song peaked at number 90 on the UK Singles Chart.

Music video
A music video to accompany the release of "Sing That Song" was first released onto YouTube on 11 September 2014 at a total length of three minutes and eight seconds.

Track listing

Chart performance

Weekly charts

Release history

References

2014 songs
2014 singles
Atlantic Records singles
Celeste (singer) songs